The Real Cancun is an original soundtrack for 2003 American reality film The Real Cancun, released by Thrive on May 13, 2003. The album consists of such popular names as Simple Plan, Trick Daddy and the Kottonmouth Kings among others.

Track listing

References

2003 compilation albums
Film soundtracks
2003 soundtrack albums